William Burgess (birth registered first ¼ 1939) is an English former rugby union, and professional rugby league footballer who played in the 1960s and 1970s.

Background
Bill Burgess' birth was registered in Barrow-in-Furness district, Lancashire, England.

Playing career

International honours

Bill Burgess won caps for England (RL) while at Barrow in 1962 against France, in 1969 against Wales, and France, and won caps for Great Britain (RL) while at Barrow in 1962 against France, in 1963 against Australia, in 1965 against New Zealand (2 matches), in 1966 against France, Australia (3 matches), and New Zealand (2 matches), in 1967 against France, and Australia, in 1968 against France, and while at Salford in 1969 against France.

County honours
Bill Burgess won a cap for Lancashire (RU) while at Fylde, and won caps for Lancashire (RL) while at Barrow.

Challenge Cup Final appearances
Bill Burgess played in Barrow's 12–17 defeat by Featherstone Rovers in the 19–6667 Challenge Cup Final during the 1966–67 season at Wembley Stadium, London on Saturday 13 May 1967, and played in Salford's 6–11 defeat by Castleford in the 1968–69 Challenge Cup Final during the 1968–69 season at Wembley Stadium, London on Saturday 17 May 1969.

Career records
Bill Burgess is third in Barrow's all time try scorers list with 179-tries.

Honoured at Barrow Raiders
Bill Burgess is a Barrow Raiders Hall of Fame inductee.

Genealogical Information
Bill Burgess is the son of the rugby league footballer; Bill Burgess.

References

External links
Hall of Fame at barrowrlfc.com
(archived by web.archive.org) Barrow RL’s great Britons

1939 births
Living people
Barrow Raiders players
England national rugby league team players
English rugby league players
Fylde Rugby Club players
Great Britain national rugby league team players
Lancashire rugby league team players
Lancashire County RFU players
Rugby league players from Barrow-in-Furness
Rugby league wingers
Salford Red Devils players